The Wildhuser Schafberg is a mountain of the Appenzell Alps, overlooking Wildhaus in the canton of St. Gallen. It is situated in the massif of the Alpstein, on the range west of the Altmann.

References

External links
Wildhuser Schafberg on Hikr
 Spherical panorama of Wildhuser Schafberg

Mountains of the Alps
Mountains of Switzerland
Mountains of the canton of St. Gallen
Appenzell Alps